Michael Rooker (born April 6, 1955) is an American actor known for his roles as Henry in Henry: Portrait of a Serial Killer (1986), Chick Gandil in Eight Men Out (1988), Frank Baily in Mississippi Burning (1988), Terry Cruger in Sea of Love (1989), Rowdy Burns in Days of Thunder (1990), Bill Broussard in JFK (1991), Hal Tucker in Cliffhanger (1993), Sherman McMaster in Tombstone (1993), Jared Svenning in Mallrats (1995), Detective Howard Cheney in The Bone Collector (1999), Grant Grant in Slither (2006), Merle Dixon in AMC's The Walking Dead (2010–2013), Yondu Udonta in Guardians of the Galaxy (2014), its sequel, Guardians of the Galaxy Vol. 2 (2017), and the animated series What If...? (2021), and Savant in The Suicide Squad (2021).

Since 2006, he has been a frequent collaborator of filmmaker James Gunn, and has appeared in all five films Gunn has directed so far.

Early life
Rooker was born in Jasper, Alabama. He has nine brothers and sisters. His parents divorced when he was 13, and he moved with his mother and siblings to Chicago, Illinois, where he attended Wells Community Academy High School and studied at the Goodman School of Drama at DePaul University.

Career
He made his film debut in 1986, playing the title role in Henry: Portrait of a Serial Killer, based on the confessions of serial killer Henry Lee Lucas. He was acting in a play when the play's director, who was going to do the prosthetics for Henry, told him about the role. Rooker did not care if the script was good or bad; he just wanted to act in a film as it would "challenge" him. Henry was a critical success and Rooker received more film roles.

He was given more dramatic roles in films such as Eight Men Out, Mississippi Burning, and JFK, but he became widely known for his roles in action and thriller films such as Sea of Love, Days of Thunder, Cliffhanger, and Tombstone. He also starred in Mallrats, Rosewood, The 6th Day, Slither, Jumper, Super and Hypothermia.

In June 2010, he revealed via Twitter that he was to appear in the AMC television series The Walking Dead as Merle Dixon, one of the survivors of a zombie apocalypse. He guest-starred in two episodes of the first season and one of the second season before becoming a series regular for the third season.

Rooker is also known for his roles in video games such as Call of Duty: Black Ops (where he played himself), Mike Harper in Call of Duty: Black Ops 2 in November 2012, and as Merle in The Walking Dead: Survival Instinct, the video game based on the television series.

He played Yondu in the Marvel Studios film Guardians of the Galaxy, directed by James Gunn, and reprised it in Guardians of the Galaxy Vol. 2 (2017). In 2021 he appeared in the action film F9, directed by Justin Lin.

Personal life
Rooker lives in California with his wife Margot Rooker. They married in 1979 and have two daughters. He practices the Kyokushin style of karate.

Filmography

Film

Television

Video games

References

External links

1955 births
Living people
People from Jasper, Alabama
Male actors from Alabama
American male film actors
American male television actors
American male voice actors
American male karateka
Kyokushin kaikan practitioners
DePaul University alumni
20th-century American male actors
21st-century American male actors
Male actors from Chicago